Andronymus bjornstadi is a butterfly in the family Hesperiidae. It is found in western Tanzania. The habitat consists of forests.

References

Endemic fauna of Tanzania
Butterflies described in 1998
Erionotini